Pimelea lanata is a species of flowering plant in the family Thymelaeaceae and is endemic to the southwest of Western Australia. It is a shrub with narrowly elliptic leaves and erect clusters of white to deep pink flowers surrounded by 4, mostly green, involucral bracts.

Description
Flowering occurs mainly from December to February.

Taxonomy
Pimelea lanata was first formally described in 1810 by Robert  Brown in his book Prodromus Florae Novae Hollandiae et Insulae Van Diemen. The specific epithet (lanata) means "woolly".

Distribution and habitat
This pimelea grows in winter-wet places on near-coastal plains between Perth and Albany in the Jarrah Forest, Swan Coastal Plain and Warren bioregions of south-western Western Australia.

Conservation status
Pimelea lanata is listed as "not threatened" by the Government of Western Australia Department of Biodiversity, Conservation and Attractions.

References

lanata
Malvales of Australia
Taxa named by Robert Brown (botanist, born 1773)
Plants described in 1810
Flora of Western Australia